Going the Limit may refer to:

 Going the Limit (1925 film), American silent drama film
 Going the Limit (1926 film), American silent comedy film